Brian Ellis may refer to:

 Brian Ellis (Australian politician) (born 1950), member of the Western Australian state parliament
 Brian Ellis (American politician), Pennsylvania politician
 Brian David Ellis (born 1929), philosopher of science at University of Melbourne